The Chlorobi-RRM RNA motif is a conserved RNA structure identified by bioinformatics. It is found within bacteria in the phylum Chlorobiota (formerly Chlorobi), and is exclusively detected in the presumed 5' untranslated regions (5' UTRs) of genes that encode putative RNA-binding proteins. Since many RNA-binding proteins regulate their own expression in a feedback mechanism by binding or acting up their 5' UTR, it was proposed that the Chlorobi-RRM is a component in an analogous feedback mechanism.
Structurally, the motif consists of two stem-loops, the second of which might function as a rho-independent transcription terminator.

References

External links
 

Cis-regulatory RNA elements